Ivanteyevka is a town in Moscow Oblast, Russia, located on the Ucha River  northeast of Moscow. Population:

History
Ivanteyevka was founded in 1586 as a settlement of Vanteyevo, which belonged to the Trinity Lavra of St. Sergius. It was granted town status in 1938.

Administrative and municipal status
Within the framework of administrative divisions, it is incorporated as Ivanteyevka Town Under Oblast Jurisdiction—an administrative unit with the status equal to that of the districts. As a municipal division, Ivanteyevka Town Under Oblast Jurisdiction is incorporated as Ivanteyevka Urban Okrug.

References

Notes

Sources

External links

Official website of Ivanteyevka 
Ivanteyevka Business Directory 

Cities and towns in Moscow Oblast
Populated places established in 1586
Moskovsky Uyezd